Etienne Froidevaux (born March 20, 1989) is a Swiss professional ice hockey player who currently plays for EHC Biel of the National League (NL).

During the 2022–23 season, while in his second year with EHC Biel, Froidevaux announced he would be retiring following the completion of his 17th professional season.

References

External links

1989 births
Living people
EHC Biel players
Lausanne HC players
Neuchâtel Young Sprinters HC players
SC Bern players
SC Langenthal players
SCL Tigers players
Swiss ice hockey centres
People from Biel/Bienne
Sportspeople from the canton of Bern